The Puch 500 is a city car produced by the Austrian manufacturer Puch, a subsidiary of Steyr-Daimler-Puch in Graz. It was built under licence from Fiat and was based on the Fiat 500.

The beginning 
In 1954 it was decided at Steyr-Puch to resume car production after the war. Because of the high costs associated with the development of a completely new design, an agreement was made with Fiat to acquire and adapt the body in white of their Nuova 500 model designed by Dante Giacosa. Of the body, only the engine cover and later the roof was produced in-house. On the other hand, engine, transmission and carriage were all manufactured by Steyr-Puch. The engine was a two-cylinder (16 hp/12 kW) flat engine which proved to be far more smooth-running than the straight-twin engine used by Fiat. It brought good driving behaviour for its time, especially in mountain rides. The Italians too had experimented mounting this engine to their car originally, but it was dropped in favor of the simpler in-line twin.

The first Steyr-Puch 500 Modell Fiat was launched in 1957 and sold well. At first it was offered with a folding roof only, and it was expected to draw in motorcyclists as a buying audience. The Puchwagen or Pucherl, as it was called, was the official car for the Austrian AA-service.

Development 

In 1959 came the first revision. The model Steyr-Puch 500 D was provided with the metal roof produced by Fiat (D for Dach, i.e. "roof"  in German), and in addition to that the luxury model 500 DL was equipped with a stronger engine (20 hp/15 kW). 1961 saw the launch of two estate models, 700 C (C for Combi) and 700 E (E for Economy), both featuring a larger 643 cc engine but with different power ratings. In 1962 the sedan, too, was equipped with the larger engine, leading to the 650 T (T for Thondorf, the location of the manufacturing plant in Graz). 

A few years later the engine was boosted even more, resulting in the models 650 TR and 650 TR II (R for Rallye) – models at first intended for police use, but later also offered as standard. Going through homologation in the Group 2 racing class, they successfully participated in motorsport events, competing with its Abarth sister models. In 1966 the Polish driver Sobiesław Zasada won the European Rally Championship with a Steyr-Puch 650 TR II, the smallest vehicle ever to achieve such victory. Gerard van Lennep won the Production Cars Championship (up to 700 cc.) of the Netherlands in 1966 and 1967 with a yellow 650 TR. He also competed in European Cup races, winning in Belgrade.

The body and outfit had remained more or less the same, until in 1967 the modified Fiat 500 design introduced in 1965 was adopted in Graz. The most essential new feature were the front hinged doors as opposed to the former suicide doors. At the same time, the roof was adopted from Fiat. The new models were given the additional label "Europa". In 1969, due to decreasing demand, it was decided to adopt not only the body but the complete drivetrain minus engine from Fiat. The engine was the only unit remaining under local manufacture and the model was now called 500 S (Sport).

In 1960, 20-year-old recent design school graduate Werner Hölbl designed a handsome italianate coupé bodywork for the Puch 500. It is referred to as the Steyr Puch Adria TS, the Puch Adria TS, or also Steyr-Puch 700 Sport-Coupé. One example was presented to Gianni Agnelli who was visiting Austria, as series production was hoped for, but it never materialized and only 18 examples were built. The cars built were finished mostly by hand in Hölbl's father's bodyshop - the first few cars in Klagenfurt but most of them after a move to Vienna. To improve the proportions of the car, the longer chassis of the 700 C estate.

In 1973, Fiat's successor model, the 126, was adopted in Graz. Here, too, Puch restricted themselves essentially to fitting a Puch flat engine in the otherwise nearly finished car. As early as 1975, production was stopped due to diminishing demand.

The small car sold well, with around 60,000 units produced between 1957 and 1975. Despite restrictive licensing terms from Fiat, quite a few cars were distributed outside Austria, most of them in Germany and Hungary, as well as in Finland, imported by Sisu Auto.

Gallery

References

Literature and sources
 Steyr Puch Club Salzburg 
 Friends of Steyr Puch Austria 
 Johann Puch Museum, Graz Austria

Steyr-Puch vehicles
Cars powered by boxer engines
Cars powered by 2-cylinder engines
City cars
Cars introduced in 1957
Rear-engined vehicles
1960s cars
1970s cars